The ADAC GT4 Germany is a grand tourer-based auto racing series that is largely held in Germany. The races are held as part of the ADAC GT Masters, and GT4 vehicles are used. The championship took place for the first time in 2019.

History
On 27 July 2019, in a press conference of the 24 Hours of Spa, it was announced that ADAC had acquired the rights to the GT4 class for Germany and that its existing motorsport program (consisting of: ADAC GT Masters, TCR Germany and ADAC Formula 4) wants to expand. The new racing series is based on the ADAC GT Masters and is intended as a springboard for young talents. The foundation of the series was initiated by Hermann Tomczyk (ADAC Sport President), Lars Soutschka (ADAC Managing Director) and Stéphane Ratel (founder and CEO of the SRO Motorsports Group). ADAC GT4 Germany was integrated into the ADAC motorsport program in 2019.

Race format

The round begins with 2 qualifying sessions, each 20 minutes. In Q1 the starting place for the first race is determined, in Q2 the starting place for the second race. There are 2 races per race weekend; the races last one hour like in the ADAC GT Masters. A driver change must be made between the 25th and 35th minute of the race. There is a minimum downtime that depends on the track and BOP; during a pit stop, a maximum of 2 people may work on the vehicle.

Champions

References

External links

 

ADAC GT Masters
Recurring sporting events established in 2019
2019 establishments in Germany
GT4 (sports car class)